This is a list of municipalities in Iceland which have standing links to local communities in other countries known as "town twinning" (usually in Europe) or "sister cities" (usually in the rest of the world).

A
Akranes

 Bamble, Norway
 Närpes, Finland
 Qaqortoq, Greenland
 Sørvágur, Faroe Islands
 Tønder, Denmark
 Västervik, Sweden

Akureyri

 Ålesund, Norway
 Denver, United States
 Gimli, Canada
 Hafnarfjörður, Iceland
 Lahti, Finland

 Narsaq, Greenland
 Randers, Denmark
 Vágur, Faroe Islands
 Västerås, Sweden

Árborg

 Arendal, Norway
 Kalmar, Sweden
 Savonlinna, Finland

B
Blönduós

 Horsens, Denmark
 Karlstad, Sweden
 Moss, Norway
 Nokia, Finland

D
Dalvíkurbyggð

 Hamar, Norway
 Ittoqqortoormiit (Sermersooq), Greenland
 Lund, Sweden
 Porvoo, Finland
 Viborg, Denmark

F
Fjarðabyggð

 Esbjerg, Denmark
 Eskilstuna, Sweden
 Gravelines, France
 Jyväskylä, Finland
 Qeqqata, Greenland
 Stavanger, Norway
 Vágar, Faroe Islands

Fljótsdalshérað

 Eidsvoll, Norway
 Raseborg, Finland
 Runavík, Faroe Islands
 Skara, Sweden
 Sorø, Denmark

G
Garðabær

 Asker, Norway
 Eslöv, Sweden
 Jakobstad, Finland
 Rudersdal, Denmark

Grindavík

 Ílhavo, Portugal
 Jonzac, France
 Penistone, England, United Kingdom
 Piteå, Sweden
 Rovaniemi, Finland
 Uniejów, Poland

Grundarfjarðarbær
 Paimpol, France

H
Hafnarfjörður

 Akureyri, Iceland
 Bærum, Norway
 Baoding, China
 Cuxhaven, Germany
 Frederiksberg, Denmark
 Hämeenlinna, Finland
 Ilulissat, Greenland
 Tartu, Estonia
 Tvøroyri, Faroe Islands
 Uppsala, Sweden

Hveragerði

 Äänekoski, Finland
 Ikast-Brande, Denmark
 Örnsköldsvik, Sweden
 Sigdal, Norway
 Tarp, Germany

I
Ísafjarðarbær

 Joensuu, Finland
 Kaufering, Germany
 Linköping, Sweden
 Runavík, Faroe Islands
 Tønsberg, Norway

K
Kópavogur

 Klaksvík, Faroe Islands
 Mariehamn, Åland Islands, Finland
 Norrköping, Sweden
 Odense, Denmark
 Sermersooq, Greenland
 Tampere, Finland
 Trondheim, Norway
 Wuhan, China

M
Mosfellsbær

 Loimaa, Finland
 Skien, Norway
 Thisted, Denmark
 Uddevalla, Sweden

N
Norðurþing

 Aalborg, Denmark
 Eastport, United States
 Fredrikstad, Norway
 Fuglafjørður, Faroe Islands
 Karlskoga, Sweden
 Qeqertarsuaq, Greenland
 Riihimäki, Finland

R
Reykjanesbær

 Kerava, Finland
 Trollhättan, Sweden

Reykjavík

 Moscow, Russia
 Seattle, United States
 Vilnius, Lithuania
 Winnipeg, Canada
 Wrocław, Poland

S
Seltjarnarnes

 Lieto, Finland
 Nesodden, Norway
 Herlev, Denmark
 Höganäs, Sweden

Seyðisfjörður terminated all its twinnings.

Skagafjörður

 Espoo, Finland
 Køge, Denmark
 Kongsberg, Norway
 Kristianstad, Sweden

Skagaströnd

 Lohja, Finland
 Ringerike, Norway
 Växjö, Sweden

Snæfellsbær
 Vestmanna, Faroe Islands

Strandabyggð

 Faaborg-Midtfyn, Denmark
 Hole, Norway
 Kustavi, Finland
 Tanum, Sweden

Stykkishólmur

 Drammen, Norway
 Kolding, Denmark
 Lappeenranta, Finland
 Örebro, Sweden

V
Vestmannaeyjar
 Borlänge, Sweden

Vesturbyggð terminated all its twinnings.

References

Iceland
Iceland geography-related lists
Foreign relations of Iceland
Populated places in Iceland